The Siemens-Schuckert R.VI was a bomber aircraft built in Germany during World War I. It was one of six aircraft based on the Siemens-Schuckert R.I, which were originally intended to be identical.  Each developed in a different direction and were designated as different aircraft types by the German Inspectorate of Flying Troops (the Idflieg). 

Development of the R.VI benefited from the experience that Siemens-Schuckert and the Idflieg had gained with the R.II, R.III, and R.IV, particularly in its choice of powerplants, where the R.VI was spared from the troublesome Maybach HS engine. The R.VI was the first of the Siemens-Schuckert R-type aircraft to reach service, and saw service on the Eastern Front between July 1916 and November 1917, before it was declared obsolete and dismantled.

Design and development
As designed, the R.VI was a large three-bay biplane with unstaggered wings of unequal span and a fully enclosed cabin. Three 180-kW (240-hp) Maybach HS engines were mounted internally in the fuselage, and transmitted their power via driveshafts to two propellers mounted tractor-fashion on the interplane struts nearest the fuselage. The main undercarriage consisted of divided units, each of which carried dual wheels, and the tail was supported by a pair of tailwheels. The fuselage was forked into an upper and lower section, which allowed a clear field of fire to the rear of the aircraft. 

The Maybach engines had been a never-ending source of trouble on the R.II, R.III, and R.IV, and by June 1916, Siemens-Schuckert had obtained permission from the Idflieg to substitute Benz Bz.IV engines on the R.III The firm made the same change on the R.VI, which was under construction at the time. The fuselage was modified to accommodate the new powerplant, and an extra bay was added to the wings, increasing their span. Upon completion, designer Bruno Steffen piloted the R.VI on a test flight in which the aircraft carried a 2,400-kg (5,300-lb) load for six hours, a world record at the time, but one which was never publicised due to the war.

Despite this remarkable flight, the R.VI did not meet the specifications issued by the Idflieg in its contract with Siemens-Schuckert. Therefore, the Idflieg opted to relax the original specifications somewhat and complete the purchase of the aircraft.

The Siemens-Schuckert R.II to R.VII were ordered in the G (Grossflugzeug - large aircraft) series and given serial numbers G.32/15 to G.37/15 respectively. These serials were changed on 13 July 1915 to G.33/15 - G.38/15, for unknown reasons and again on 6 November 1915 to R.2/15 - R.7/15 in the R (Riesenflugzeug - giant aircraft) series, adopting the R.II to R.VII designations.

Operational history
Siemens-Schuckert delivered the R.VI to the Riesenflugzeugersatzabteilung (Rea — "giant aircraft support unit") at Döberitz on 20 July 1916. From there, it was assigned to Riesenflugzeugabteilung 501 (Rfa 501), and joined the squadron at Vilna on 7 August. It operated there until it was dismantled as obsolete in November 1917.

Specific details of several operational missions while with Rfa 501 have survived: 
 3 September 1916 — railway station at Molodeczne
 4 September 1916 — unknown target

Additionally, the R.VI carried out the following raids together with the R.V:
 19 January 1917 — troop camp at Iza
 30 January 1917 — railway station at Wileyka
 8 February 1917 — railway station at Molodeczne
 12 February 1917 — railway station at Zalesie

together with the R.VII:
 2 March 1917 — railway stations at Zalesie and Molodeczne
 7 March 1917 — railway stations at Wileyka and Molodeczne
 16 March 1917 — troop camp at Iza

and together with the R.IV and R.VII:
 1 April 1917 — town of Naracz
 5 April 1917 — railway station at Wileyka
 5 June 1917 — troop camp at Biala
 18 June 1917 — supply dump at Overky
 2 August 1917 — reconnaissance mission over railway station at Prudy

Specifications

Notes

References

 
 
 
 
 

1910s German bomber aircraft
R.VI
Three-engined twin-prop tractor aircraft
Biplanes
Aircraft first flown in 1916